The New Orleans Classic Stakes is an American Thoroughbred horse race run annually at Fair Grounds Race Course in New Orleans, Louisiana.  Open to horses four years old and up, the race is run at a distance of one and one-eighth miles on the dirt. It currently offers a purse of  $400,000.

Due to flooding as a result of Hurricane Katrina, the 2006 edition of the New Orleans Handicap was run at Louisiana Downs in Bossier City, Louisiana.

Historical notes

Wild Again, the winner of the first Breeders' Cup Classic, took this race in 1984, and Mineshaft won this race during his 2003 Horse of the Year campaign.

Records
Speed record: (at current distance of  miles) 
 1:47.64 - Nates Mineshaft (2012)

Most wins:
 2 - Marriage (1943, 1944)
 2 - Tenacious (1958, 1959)
 2 - Honor Medal (1987, 1988)

Most wins by a jockey:
 4 - Ray Broussard (1958, 1959, 1961, 1964)

Most wins by a trainer:
 6 - Todd Pletcher (2007, 2008, 2010, 2011, 2013, 2014)

Most wins by an owner:
 6 - Dorothy Dorsett Brown (1950, 1958, 1959, 1964, 1967, 1983)

Winners

References
 The New Orleans Handicap at the NTRA

Fair Grounds Race Course
Graded stakes races in the United States
Open mile category horse races
Horse races in New Orleans
Horse racing
1924 establishments in Louisiana
Recurring sporting events established in 1924